The Dennis DF series was a range of heavy-duty fire engine chassis produced by Hestair Dennis (later Dennis Specialist Vehicles). Based on the Dennis RS/SS series, the DF has a  gross vehicle weight, and was produced primarily as a base for turntable ladder appliances or tanker units carrying either foam or water.

The DF could be offered in 'Firebird' or 'Waterbird' specification.

Operators

Turntable ladder appliances on the Dennis DF chassis were sold to a number of fire brigades in the United Kingdom, including the Tyne and Wear Metropolitan Fire Brigade.

The DF was also sold to fire brigades in  Hong Kong, the Middle East and Kenya. DF135s were also exported to New Zealand for use as pump tenders in the New Zealand Fire Service, with some being built with Mills-Tui bodywork.

See also
Dennis RS/SS series

References

Firefighting equipment
DF
DF